Rhamphochromis woodi is a species of piscivorous cichlid endemic to Lake Malawi where it prefers open waters at depths of from .  This species can reach a length of  TL.  It can also be found in the aquarium trade. The specific name honours Rodney C. Wood, whose collection of cichlids from Lake Malawi, which included the type of this species, was presented to the British Museum (Natural History).

References

woodi
Fish of Lake Malawi
Fish of Malawi
Fish of Mozambique
Freshwater fish of Tanzania
Taxa named by Charles Tate Regan
Fish described in 1922
Taxonomy articles created by Polbot